Desert Hell is a 1958 American adventure film directed by Charles Marquis Warren and written by Charles Marquis Warren and Endre Bohem. The film stars Brian Keith, Barbara Hale, Richard Denning, Johnny Desmond, Phillip Pine, Richard Shannon and Albert Carrier. The film was released on June 25, 1958, by 20th Century Fox.

Plot
After an ambush by an Arab tribe, two surviving French Legionnaires return to their fort. One of them, Capt. Edwards, is assigned a new patrol and a mission to alert another fort that an attack may be imminent. The other, Sgt. Major Benet, remains behind. Edwards' situation is further complicated when he catches his wife, Celie, in the arms of a lieutenant, Forbes.

Forbes catches up to the patrol to inform Edwards that the mission has been called off. Edwards disobeys orders and rides on, Forbes joining him in what he calls a suicide mission. A pair of privates, Bergstrom and Hoffstetter, desert the patrol. They are ambushed and Bergstrom is killed. A scout, Kufra, is captured and tortured as well.

In another attack, five Legionnaires are killed and Edwards is mortally wounded. He places Forbes in command. Almost making it back safely, Forbes, too, is seriously wounded and expires as Sgt. Major Benet drags him back to the fort.

Cast 
Brian Keith as Capt. Robert Edwards
Barbara Hale as Celie Edwards
Richard Denning as Sgt. Major Pierre Benet
Johnny Desmond as Lt. Richard Forbes
Phillip Pine as Cpl. Carlo Parini
Richard Shannon as Pvt. Hoffstetter
Albert Carrier as Sgt. St. Clair
Duane Grey as Pvt. Aruazza
Charles H. Gray as Pvt. Bandurski
Richard Gilden as Pvt. Kabussyan
Ron Foster as Pvt. Bergstrom
John Verros as Pvt. Kufra, scout
Michael Pate as Ahitagel
Patrick O'Moore as Pvt. Corbo
Felix Locher as Marsaya
William Hamel as Pvt. Brocklin
Bhogwan Singh as Holy Marabout 
Robert Etienne as Pvt. Sirmay

Production
Filming started November 1957.

References

External links 
 

1958 films
20th Century Fox films
American adventure films
1958 adventure films
Films directed by Charles Marquis Warren
Films set in deserts
Films about the French Foreign Legion
Films scored by Raoul Kraushaar
1950s English-language films
1950s American films